The Concealed Carry Reciprocity Act, or House Bill 38, is a bill that would amend Title 18 of the United States Code to require all U.S. states to recognize concealed carry permits granted by other states. It would also allow the concealed transport of handguns across state lines, so long as it is allowed by both states and would amend the Gun-Free School Zones Act of 1990 to allow permit holders to carry a concealed weapon in school zones in any state.

History

The 2017 version of the bill was introduced in the 115th United States Congress by Richard Hudson, a North Carolina Republican in the United States House of Representatives, on January 3, 2017. Hudson is the bill's chief sponsor, but the bill has over 200 co-sponsors as well. On November 29, the House Judiciary Committee voted 19-11 to advance the bill to the floor of the House for a vote. Congressional Democrats had proposed multiple amendments to the bill, all of which were voted down by Republicans. The bill is intended to be combined with another, bipartisan bill aimed at improving the National Instant Criminal Background Check System. On December 6, the House passed the bill 231-198.

Responses
The National Rifle Association praised the bill, writing on its website that "This would end abuses in anti-gun states like California, New York and New Jersey and allow law-abiding concealed carriers to exercise their rights nationwide with peace of mind".

Democrats have criticized the bill, claiming, among other things, that it would infringe on states' rights and adversely affect public safety. Gun control advocates such as Sara Gorman have also criticized the bill, stating that it would be dangerous for victims of domestic abuse because it would allow people to circumvent background checks for guns or permits by obtaining them in more permissive states.

On Feb. 11, 2018, it was reported that President Donald Trump "fully" supported the bill, but on Feb. 27 it was reported that Trump instead preferred Texas Sen. John Cornyn's "Fix NICS Act" that included stronger background checks. Trump signed "Fix NICS" on March 23, 2018.

See also
Fix NICS Act of 2017

References

Proposed legislation of the 114th United States Congress
Proposed legislation of the 115th United States Congress
Proposed legislation of the 116th United States Congress
Proposed legislation of the 117th United States Congress
United States federal firearms legislation